BridgeView is a  residential skyscraper in the Rincon Hill neighborhood of San Francisco, California.  The tower has 245 residential units on 26 floors.

See also

List of tallest buildings in San Francisco

References

Residential condominiums in San Francisco
Residential buildings in San Francisco
Residential skyscrapers in San Francisco
Skyscrapers in San Francisco
South of Market, San Francisco